Christian Bonfanti (born 30 November 1981 in Bergamo) is a former Italian professional road bicycle racer who rode for UCI ProTeam Domina Vacanze in 2005.

External links 

1981 births
Living people
Italian male cyclists
Cyclists from Bergamo